Putar (also Romanized as Pūţār and Pūtār; also known as Ābādī Seyyed, Ābādseyyed, Ābād Sīd, and Āb Garm-e Seyyedī) is a village in Howmeh Rural District, in the Central District of Bam County, Kerman Province, Iran. At the 2006 census, its population was 33, in 9 families.

References 

Populated places in Bam County